Jharkhand Mukti Morcha (lit. Jharkhand Liberation Front;  JMM) is a political party in the Indian state of Jharkhand which was founded by Binod Bihari Mahato. It has one seat in the 17th Lok Sabha. Shibu Soren is the president of the JMM. JMM is also an influential political party in the state of Odisha and parts of neighbouring of states. Its election symbol for Jharkhand is Bow and Arrow.

The party was officially created on the birthday of Birsa Munda, the 19th century tribal warrior of Jharkhand, who fought against the British rule in present-day Jharkhand. The State of Jharkhand also came into existence on Birsa Munda's birthday in 2000.

Formation 
For almost six decades the movement for formation of Jharkhand from Bihar had been changing colour and strategy to gain a foothold. The Jharkhand Party grew politically stronger but the commissions examining the demands for a separate Jharkhand State rejected these demands every time due to linguistic basis. Despite the reports of these commissions deciding against them, the Jharkhand Party never lost sight of its ultimate target: a separate state of Jharkhand. Till 1962 Jharkhand Party won between 23–32 seats in the Bihar Legislative Assembly. In 1962, It won 20 seats. Jaipal Singh Munda merged his party with Indian National Congress in 1963 and became a minister in Vinodanand Jha's government in Bihar. But other members did not join the Congress.

At the 4th General Election held in 1967 the party had a very poor showing with only eight Assembly seats. The party soon split into several splinter groups each claiming to be the genuine Jharkhand Party. These were – the Jharkhand Party led by N.E. Horo, the Jharkhand Party led by Naren, All India Jharkhand Party led by Bagun Sumroi, the Hul Jharkhand Party led by Justin Richard which further fragmented and came to be called the Bihar Progressive Hul Jharkhand Party and it was led by Shibu Soren.

Binod Bihari Mahato founded "Shivaji Samaj" in 1967. Santhal leader Shibu Soren founded the ‘Sonat Santhali Samaj’ in 1969.  The "Jharkhand Mukti Morcha" was founded by Binod Bihari Mahato, the leader of ‘Shivajee Samaj’, Shibu Soren and Marxist Co ordination leader Comrade Dr. A. K. Roy. The party was officially created on the birthday of Birsa Munda, the 19th century tribal warrior of Jharkhand, who fought against the British rule in present-day Jharkhand.

On 4 February 1973 Binod Bihari Mahto became the President and Shibu Soren as General Secretary of the party. The prominent party leaders at that time were: Comrade A. K. Roy (Party Secretary-Society of Industrial and Coal Laborers), Martyr Nirmal Mahto (prominent Trade Union Movement leader) and Tek Lal Mahto, among others.

Early years 

In its early years, the JMM under Soren's leadership brought industrial and mining workers who were mainly non-tribals belonging to the Dalit and Backward communities such as Surdis, Doms, Dusadh and Kudumi Mahato into its fold. However Soren's association with the late congress M.P. Gyanranjan brought him close to the then Prime Minister of India, Indira Gandhi in New Delhi. He won the Dumka Lok Sabha seat in 1972. Irked by Soren's association with the Indian National Congress, a few of the younger members of the JMM banded together in Jamshedpur and set up the All Jharkhand Students Union (AJSU). This did not affect the growth of the JMM in the 1991 Indian general election where the JMM won six seats.

Ram Dayal Munda reignited the movement for Jharkhand by unifying splinter groups among the tribals. Under his guidance the Jharkhand Coordination Committee was constituted in June 1987, comprising 48 organisations and group including the JMM factions. Due to Ram Dayal Munda, Shibu Soren, Suraj Mandal, Simon Marandi, Shailendra Mahato, and AJSU leaders like Surya Singh Besra and Prabhakar Tirkey briefly shared a political platform, but the JMM pulled out of JCC as it felt that 'the collective leadership was a farce'. The JMM/AJSU and JPP successfully orchestrated so-called bandhs, economic blockades in 1988–89 in the interim.

Jharkhand Yuva Morcha

Jharkhand Yuva Morcha (Jharkhand Youth Front), and Jharkhand Chhatra Morcha (Jharkhand Student Front), the youth and student wing of Jharkhand Mukti Morcha, was constituted at a conference in Ranchi 16 October 1991.

List of Chief Ministers 

Following is the list of the Chief Ministers of Jharkhand from Jharkhand Mukti Morcha since the formation of the state on 9 November 2000:

References

External links 
 Soren stakes claim to form Jharkhand government – TCN News

 
Regionalist parties in India
State political parties in Jharkhand
1972 establishments in Bihar
Political parties established in 1972